Muhamed Tehe Olawale (born 20 February 1999) is an Ivorian footballer who plays for Finnish club Mariehamn.

Club career
On 7 January 2021, he was loaned to Finnish side IFK Mariehamn.

On 6 January 2022, he moved on loan to Voluntari in Romania for the term of 1.5 years.

On 25 July 2022, Olawale returned to Mariehamn on a contract until the end of 2023 season.

Career statistics

Club

Notes

References

1999 births
Living people
Ivorian footballers
Ivorian expatriate footballers
Association football forwards
Serie D players
Veikkausliiga players
Liga I players
Empoli F.C. players
U.S. Pistoiese 1921 players
Parma Calcio 1913 players
Turun Palloseura footballers
IFK Mariehamn players
FC Voluntari players
Ivorian expatriate sportspeople in Italy
Ivorian expatriate sportspeople in Finland
Ivorian expatriate sportspeople in Romania
Expatriate footballers in Italy
Expatriate footballers in Finland
Expatriate footballers in Romania